Hagen Kunze (born 1973) is a German journalist, music critic and playwright.

Life 
Kunze comes from a pastor's family and learned piano at an early age. He attended the special school for music education in Zwickau and studied musicology, journalism and philosophy in Leipzig, Graz and Halle (Saale). Afterwards, he worked as a freelance journalist and music critic as well as church musician - he wrote for daily newspapers and professional journals, such as the Neue Musikzeitung.

Kunze was an editor and later editorial director of the Döbelner Allgemeine Zeitung - Leipziger Volkszeitung. This was followed by a position as personal assistant to the Saxon CDU member of the European Parliament Lutz Goepel. He also worked as a teacher at the Döbeln grammar school. Since 2013, he has been teaching at the Evangelische Oberschule Lunzenau. Kunze gained media recognition when he appeared in the satirical programme Extra3 and a TV report was dedicated to him. This happened because he did not have a particulate matter sticker on his electric car and parked in Leipzig.

Kunze is a member of the CDU.

Work 
 Das kleine Bach-Büchlein: ein Gespräch mit Johann Sebastian Bach., Minibibliothek, Buchverlag für die Frau, Leipzig 2000.
 Lobgesang: Mendelssohn in Leipzig, Lehmanns Media, Berlin 2009.
 Clara & Robert Schumann: Musik und Liebe, 2009.
 Musikalischer Stadtrundgang durch Leipzig, 2012.
 Musenkuss: Richard Wagner und die Frauen., 2013.
 Der Thomanerchor Leipzig zwischen 1928 und 1950: Umbrüche: Erinnerungen und Dokumente. CD supplement with the earliest sound recordings of the Thomanerchor since 1928, Edition Thomanerchor vol. 1, Querstand, Altenburg 2013 (ed. with Steffen Lieberwirth).
 Der Thomanerchor Leipzig in frühesten Filmdokumenten. Zwischen Tradition und Moderne; DVD with Filmdokumenten des Thomanerchores von 1941,1942 and 2012, Edition Thomanerchor Bd. 2, Querstand, Altenburg 2013 (ed. with Stefan Altner and Günter Atteln)
 Das Thomaner-Büchlein, 2014.
 Große Sachsen, Minibibliothek, 2015.
 Die Geheimnisse der Familie Bach, 2015.
 Wunderkinder.
 200 Jahre Opernchor Leipzig (ed.), Verlag Klaus-Jürgen Kamprad, Altenburg 2017
 Große Thüringer, 2017
 Spioninnen: Mata Hari und andere Frauen in geheimer Mission, 2017
 Gin, 2018
 Leonardo da Vinci, 2019
 Beethoven und die Liebe, 2019

References

External links 
 
 Hagen Kunze auf der Webseite des Buchverlags für die Frau

German music critics
Dramaturges
20th-century German journalists
German opinion journalists
Christian Democratic Union of Germany politicians
1973 births
Living people